Pastels or pastel colors belong to a pale family of colors, which, when described in the HSV color space, have high value and low saturation. They are named after an artistic medium made from pigment and solid binding agents, similar to crayons. Pastel sticks historically tended to have lower saturation than paints of the same pigment, hence the name of this color family.

The colors of this family are usually described as "soothing." Pink, mauve, and baby blue are commonly used pastel colors, as are mint green, peach, periwinkle, and lavender. Pastel colors are common in the kawaii aesthetic.

In fashion

Pastel Academia
Pastel academia draws inspiration from East Asian and European cultures, mixing them with modern and pastel themes to form the aesthetic. Pastel Academia fashion focuses on comfort and pastel colors. A common form of the style takes inspiration from preppy fashion and school uniforms (both in real life and anime), whose silhouettes are recreated with a pastel color palette, as well as the addition of cute motifs and accessories. Casual outfits in pastel colors are often seen in the aesthetic as well, however, makeup is rarely seen as the focus of Pastel Academia, and light and natural looks are common.

Soft Girl
The Soft Girl fashion style is based on a deliberately cutesy, feminine look with a girly girl attitude, but also may involve a tender, sweet and vulnerable personality. The trend consists mainly of pastel colors, Y2K, anime, K-pop, and 90s-inspired clothing, as well as cute and nostalgic prints. It parallels some of the kawaii-centric aesthetics in Japan, but with a more subdued look.

Pastel Goth and Pastel Punk
A form of goth style called Pastel Goth adds pastel colors to the usually monochrome palette of gothic fashion. It is a result of mixing goth or grunge with the pastel elements of the kawaii aesthetic.

Pastel Punk mixes the elements of other pastel fashions with punk, often in a similar manner to Pastel Goth.

Examples

Gallery

References

External links 
 

Color